The Balm-Boyette Scrub Nature Preserve is a  preserve located in Hillsborough County, Florida. It was purchased through joint funding from the County's Environmental Lands Acquisition and Protection Program (ELAPP) and the State of Florida's Conservation and Recreation Lands (CARL) Program. While it consists largely of abandoned phosphate pits, it has a large area of undisturbed scrub habitat. Natural habitats within the site include sand pine scrub, xeric oak scrub, pine flatwoods, hardwood hammock, wet prairie, freshwater marsh, cypress swamp, and hardwood swamp. During the 1960s (and prior) the land was pitted with phosphate mines.  The natural waterflow had been altered from its original state into a series of stagnant pools. In 2016, a project was undertaken under the umbrella of Swiftmud's Surface Water Improvement and Management, or SWIM, program. The project will create a "habitat mosaic" with habitat for wading birds as well as upland creatures.

Many protected species of plants and animals have been documented on the site, including Florida golden aster, Curtiss' Milkweed, Eastern indigo snake, Sherman's fox squirrel, Florida sandhill crane (Grus canadensis pratensis), Southeastern American kestrel (Falco sparverius paulus), and gopher tortoise. Invasive species, such as the Argentine Tegu lizard, have also been spotted in the preserve.

The  Triple Creek Preserve adjoins Balm-Boyette Scrub's north boundary. The trails are maintained by a volunteer organization, the SouthWest Association of Mountain Bike Pedalers (SWAMP). In the future, a second parking area will be added at the "Deuces R Wild" gate at 13299 Balm-Boyette Rd. The area got its name from the three creeks that run through portions of the property—Bell Creek, Boggy Creek, and Fish Hawk Creek, all of which flow into the Alafia River. The preserve has a mix of wetland and upland habitat types, including pine flat- woods, wetland forests, and improved pasture areas. It is home to many rare species of plants and animals including flakelet fern and grass-pink orchids.

Triple Creek was jointly purchased by ELAPP and the Florida Communities Trust (FCT).

Facilities
The park has no structures or facilities other than a parking lot and one portable bathroom stall. Additional parking is available on the wide shoulders of Balm-Boyette Road.

Mountain biking
The preserve has become a destination mountain biking trip, with over 25 miles of trails, mostly singletrack.  The trails provide a wide mix of difficulties from beginner to expert.

References 

Trail map Hillsborough County
Balm-Boyette Scrub Preserve is salve for Hillsborough's fast lane Tampa Bay Times
Balm Boyette Scrub Preserve Mountain Bike Trail SouthWest Association of Mountain bike Pedalers
Restoration Work Still to Be Completed After Alafia River Acid Spill TheLedger.com
Mountain bikers get okay for Starkey Wilderness Park trail Tampa Bay Times
Bike trail receives improvements The Tampa Tribune

Protected areas of Hillsborough County, Florida
Nature reserves in Florida
Mountain biking venues in the United States